Albert Forsythe may refer to:
 Albert P. Forsythe (1830–1906), US politician
Albert Ernest Forsythe (1897–1986), American physician